Ittibittium is a genus of very small sea snails, marine gastropod mollusks in the family Cerithiidae.

Species
Species within the genus Ittibittium include:
 Ittibittium houbricki (Ponder, 1993)
 Ittibittium oryza (Mörch, 1876)
 Ittibittium parcum (Gould, 1861)
Species brought into synonymy
 Ittibittium nipponkaiense (Habe & Masuda, 1990): synonym of Ittibittium parcum (Gould, 1861)
 Ittibittium turricula (Usticke, 1969): synonym of Ittibittium oryza (Mörch, 1876)
 Ittibittium turriculum [sic] accepted as Ittibittium turricula (Usticke, 1969): synonym of Ittibittium oryza (Mörch, 1876) (misspelling)

References

 Ponder, W., 1993. A new cerithiid from south Western Australia (Mollusca: Gastropoda: Caenogastropoda: Cerithiidae). Proceedings of the Third International Marine Biological Workshop 1: 267-277

External links
 Houbrick, Richard S. "Phylogenetic relationships and generic review of the Bittiinae (Prosobranchia: Cerithioidea)." Malacologia (1993).

Cerithiidae